Salt Springville, also known as Salt Springsville, is a hamlet southeast of Fort Plain. It is located partially in the towns of Minden and Cherry Valley, on the Montgomery County/Otsego County border in New York, United States. The Windfall Dutch Barn is located here and was added to the National Register of Historic Places in 2000.

References

Hamlets in New York (state)
Hamlets in Montgomery County, New York
Hamlets in Otsego County, New York